Janet Derecho Duterte (born September 24, 1970), known professionally as Keanna Reeves, is a Filipina actress and comedian. She won the first celebrity edition of the reality show Pinoy Big Brother in 2006. She first gained national attention and notoriety in December 2004 after revealing that she was an escort, confessing that lawmakers were among her clients.

Biography

Early life and career
Duterte adopted the stage name Keanna Reeves as a feminine version of Hollywood actor Keanu Reeves' name.

Pinoy Big Brother
In 2005, she appeared on Extra Challenge, where she won the challenges with her teammate and then enemy Tita Swarding. Continuing her stints on reality shows, in February 2006, she was selected to be one of the 14 housemates in Pinoy Big Brother: Celebrity Edition. She won the competition, winning P4 million worth of cash and prizes. Her chosen charity, women's rights advocate group Gabriela (the sister party of Bayan Muna), received P1 million. She did one movie, Binibining K with Troy Montero in 2006.

Filmography

Film

Television

References

External links
 

1970 births
Living people
Reality show winners
Filipino film actresses
Star Magic
Pinoy Big Brother contestants
Filipino television actresses
People from Cebu City
Actresses from Cebu
Filipino women comedians
Big Brother (franchise) winners